The 1994–95 Liga Alef season saw Maccabi Acre and Hapoel Kfar Shalem promoted to Liga Artzit as the respective winners of the North and South division.

At the bottom, Hapoel Tirat HaCarmel (from North division), Hapoel Be'er Ya'akov and Hapoel Daliyat al-Karmel (from South division) were all relegated to Liga Bet, whilst Hapoel Tiberias (from North division) folded during the season.

North Division

Hapoel Tiberias folded prior to their fourth match against Hapoel Acre, after they announced their inability to hold a team, following a debt of 700,000 NIS.

South Division

References
Liga Alef: Be'er Ya'akov is the last relegated (Article No. 85130) Haaretz, 28.5.95, Haaretz Archive 

Liga Alef seasons
3
Israel